The Primavera Sound 2019 was held on 30 May to 1 June 2019 at the Parc del Fòrum, Barcelona, Spain. The festival was preceded by the event, Primavera a la Ciutat, which was located in the downtown Barcelona, featuring many performances including Big Red Machine, Deerhunter and Apparat.

The headliners included Erykah Badu, Tame Impala, Solange, Future, Miley Cyrus, J Balvin, Interpol, Janelle Monáe, and Rosalía. The 2019 lineup sought to highlight "gender equality, eclecticism and audacity", as deemed as the "New Normal", with 50/50 gender representation.

Lineup
Headline performers are listed in boldface. Artists listed from latest to earliest set times.

Seat

Pull&Bear

Primavera

Ray-Ban

Pitchfork

Adidas Originals

Auditori Rockdelux

Night Pro

Your Heineken Stage

Ray-Ban Studios

Seat Village Stage

Primavera a la Ciutat line up

Sala Apolo

La (2) de Apolo

Day Pro

Living Primavera by Ikea

Barcelona

Primavera Bits lineup

Lotus

Desperados Cube

Xiringuito Aperol

El Punto by adidas Originals

Notes

References

2019 music festivals
Music festivals in Spain
Primavera Sound